Rast or RAST may refer to:

People 
 Brian Rast (born 1981), American poker player
 Cam Rast (born 1970), American soccer player
 Camille Rast (born 1999), Swiss alpine skier
 Diana Rast (born 1970), Swiss racing cyclist
 Grégory Rast (born 1980), Swiss racing cyclist
 Holt Rast (1917–1988), American football player
 René Rast (born 1986), German racing driver
 Rast, Prince (died 1531), Kazan prince

Places 
 Rast, Nevesinje, Bosnia and Herzegovina 
 Rast, Iran
 Rast, Dolj, Romania
 Rast (Novi Pazar), Serbia

Acronyms 
 Radioallergosorbent test
 Radio Amateur Society of Thailand
 RAST system (Recovery Assist, Secure and Traverse), US Navy version of a device used for naval helicopter landings
 Royal Agricultural Society of Tasmania

Other uses 
 Rast (character), a character in the A Song of Ice and Fire novels
 Rast (maqam), a dastgāh (mode) in Persian music
 Rast (mode),  a musical modal system in traditional mugham music
 Rast, an old Scandinavian unit of distance, see Scandinavian mile

See also 
 MG-RAST an open source web application server that suggests automatic phylogenetic and functional analysis of metagenomes